Birkeland is a village in Austevoll municipality in Vestland county, Norway.  The village is located just to the north of the village of Storebø, the municipal centre.  Birkeland is included in the urban area of Storebø which has a population (2019) of 1,588.

Name
The village is named after the old Birkeland farm (Old Norse: Birkiland). The first element is birki which means 'birch forest' and the last element is land which means 'land' or 'farm'.

References

Villages in Vestland
Austevoll